The governor of Sikkim is the head of state of the Indian state of Sikkim. The governor is the representative of the president of India in the state and is the nominal head of the state's executive power. This is a list of the governors of Sikkim.

Powers and functions

The governor enjoys many different types of powers:

Executive powers related to administration, appointments and removals,
Legislative powers related to lawmaking and the state legislature, that is Vidhan Sabha or Vidhan Parishad, and
Discretionary powers to be carried out according to the discretion of the governor.

Governors of Sikkim

See also
 Sikkim
 Chief Minister of Sikkim
 Governors of India

Notes and references

External links
The Raj Bhavan

Sikkim
 
Governors